Carlsson Bay is a square bay,  in extent, entered  northwest of Cape Foster on the southwest side of James Ross Island. It was first seen and surveyed in 1903 by the Swedish Antarctic Expedition under Otto Nordenskiöld, who named it for J. Carlsson of Sweden who contributed toward the cost of the expedition. The bay was resurveyed by the Falkland Islands Dependencies Survey in 1952–53.

References 

Bays of James Ross Island